William Trench may refer to:

William Trench, 1st Earl of Clancarty (1741-1805), Anglo-Irish aristocrat and politician
William Trench, 3rd Earl of Clancarty (1803-1872), Irish nobleman
William Trench III (1831-1896), reeve of Richmond Hill, Ontario
William Le Poer Trench (1837-1920), Anglo-Irish politician and British army officer